Giuseppe Fanfani (born 19 April 1947 in Sansepolcro) is an Italian politician and lawyer.

Giuseppe is Amintore Fanfani's nephew. He joined the Italian People's Party after the dissolution of the Christian Democracy in 1994. Fanfani was elected at the 2001 Italian general election, serving as member of the Chamber of Deputies for the XIV Legislature. He joined the Democratic Party in 2007.

Fanfani was elected Mayor of Arezzo on 30 May 2006 and re-elected for a second term on 19 May 2011. He resigned in September 2014 after his election at the High Council of the Judiciary.

See also
2001 Italian general election
2006 Italian local elections
2011 Italian local elections
List of mayors of Arezzo

References

External links
 
 

1947 births
Living people
Mayors of Arezzo
Democratic Party (Italy) politicians
Christian Democracy (Italy) politicians
Democracy is Freedom – The Daisy politicians
Italian People's Party (1994) politicians
University of Perugia alumni